Cosmopterix brevicaudella is a moth of the family Cosmopterigidae. It is known from Fujian, China.

The length of the forewings is about 4.2 mm.

References

brevicaudella